98.1 AR FM (DWHQ 98.1 MHz) is an FM station owned by Hypersonic Broadcasting Center and operated by Mahalta Broadcasting Network and Media Services. Its studios and transmitter are located at 4th Floor, Delrol Building, National Highway, Brgy. Katwiran II, Baco, Oriental Mindoro.

References

External links
AR FM FB Page

Radio stations in Mindoro
Radio stations established in 2019